Melanie Nocher (born 18 June 1988 in County Down, Northern Ireland) is an Irish swimmer. She competed in the 200 m freestyle and 200 m backstroke at the 2008 Summer Olympics.  She competed at the 2012 Summer Olympics in the women's 100 metre backstroke, finishing in 33rd place in the heats, failing to qualify for the semifinals.  She also competed in the 200 m backstroke but again did not qualify for the semifinals.

She has stripped off to be painted for the RTÉ documentary, simply titled Naked.

References

1988 births
Living people
Female swimmers from Northern Ireland
Female backstroke swimmers
Olympic swimmers of Ireland
Swimmers at the 2008 Summer Olympics
Swimmers at the 2012 Summer Olympics